Zamalek (al zamalek) is a qism (ward) within the West District (hayy gharb) in the Western Area of Cairo, Egypt. It is a man-made island which geologically is part of the west bank of the Nile River, with the bahr al-a'ma (Blind Canal) cut to separate it from the west bank proper. The island is connected with the river banks by four bridges: the Qasr El Nil Bridge, Galaa Bridge, 15th of May Bridge and 6th October Bridge. It has witnessed many phases of growth affected by many economic and political currents which has led to a crowding of parts of the island including great reductions in the Zamalek district's open green areas, but with a large greenbelt across the island's middle.

Description 

Zamalek, along with Maadi, Mohandessin, Heliopolis, and Garden City, is one of the affluent residential districts in Greater Cairo. There are many apartments with sporadic maintenance because the landlords rarely make improvements; there are rent control programmes that allow several Zamalek complexes to house low income and middle income Egyptians.

The quiet, leafy streets and 19th-century apartment blocks and villas make this one of the most attractive parts of the city and a favored residential location for many of Cairo's European expatriates due to the fact that many foreign embassies are located in Zamalek. It is also the district of many fine restaurants, bars and cafes, including traditional open-air ahwas and European cappuccino bars. The Gezira Island area is culturally active: with art galleries and museums, including the Museum of Islamic Ceramics; and two of Cairo’s major music and performing arts venues – the spacious Egyptian Opera House complex, and the El Sawy Culture Wheel Centre.

Several Zamalek buildings have an Art Deco style.

History 

Under Khedive Ismail the Island was called "Jardin des Plantes" (Garden of Plants), because of its great collection of exotic plants shipped from all over the world. French landscape designer De la Chevalerie designed the island's landscape plan, gardens, and plant nurseries. On the east shore a kiosk was built for attending the island and supervising its development. Although the area is known as "Gezira Island", this is an unknown nomenclature for those living in Cairo and adjacent areas, most Egyptians know the area simply as "Zamalek".

The kiosk was replaced in 1869 with the Gezirah Palace, a U-shaped summer mansion, which was designed by Julius Franz Pasha and decorated by Karl Von Diebitsch. The palace was built and first used for guests attending the 1869 opening of the Suez Canal. Emperor Franz Josef I of Austria and Eugénie, Empress of the French were some of the noble guests of the palace. Today the Gezira Palace is the central part of the Cairo Marriott Hotel, with its rooftop having an open-air theatre facing the Nile.

Other palaces were also built in Zamalek, including Prince of the Sa'id Toussoun's palace, which is now a branch of the Council of Ministers, and Prince Amr Ibrahim Palace (1924), which is now the Museum of Islamic Ceramics. In 1882 the Gezira Sporting Club was built in the southern region of the island. Later a water garden known as the "Grotto Garden", with a rare collection of African fish, was built by British Captain Stanley Flower in Zamalek.

Several notable Egyptian figures lived in Zamalek including the Diva of the East Umm Kulthum and the famous movie star Salah Zulfikar.

Demographics 
As of 2021, 15,742 people live on the island. There is 1 hospital in Zamalek.

Landmarks 

 Gezira Sporting Club (1882), the oldest club in Egypt.
 Cairo Tower (1960), the tallest concrete construction in Egypt, built near the Gezira Sporting Club.
 Egyptian Opera House (1988), built near the Cairo Tower, and one of the better performing arts venues in the Middle East.
 El Sawy Culture Wheel Centre (2003), located beneath 15 May Bridge in Zamalek, one of the most important cultural venues in Egypt.
 Museum of Islamic Ceramics
 Faculty of Fine Arts (1908)
 All Saints' Cathedral, Cairo
 Gezirah House, Omarah El Yamani, Oldest Building in Zamalek

Education 

International schools:
 Lycée Français du Caire Zamalek Primary Campus
 Pakistan International School of Cairo
 Previously, the British International School in Cairo (BISC)

See also 
 Gezira Island

References 

+
Districts of Greater Cairo